Frontier Restaurant is a landmark New Mexican cuisine restaurant, located near the main campus of the University of New Mexico in Albuquerque, New Mexico. It is one of the city's most popular restaurants, serving about 4,000 customers per day in 2000, and is open daily from 5 am to 12 am.

History

Frontier Restaurant was established in 1971 by Dorothy and Larry Rainosek, who had recently moved to Albuquerque from Austin, Texas. Hoping to attract college students, they leased a barn-shaped building on Central Avenue across from the University of New Mexico which had previously housed a short-lived restaurant called the Country Barn. Earlier, the corner had also been the site of a popular soda fountain called Chisholm's. The Frontier opened on February 10 with just 15 menu items and five employees.

Initially, the restaurant served breakfast, hamburgers, sandwiches, and some Tex-Mex foods like enchiladas. After requests from customers, they began to incorporate New Mexican cuisine into the menu by the end of 1971. The restaurant was open 24 hours a day beginning in the early 1990s, but was forced to cut back its hours in 2006 after repeated problems with unruly patrons.

Menu
The Frontier serves primarily New Mexican cuisine along with American diner fare like sandwiches, hamburgers, and breakfast plates. Some of the best-known menu items include the sweet rolls, green chile cheeseburgers, green chile stew, carne adovada, and breakfast burritos. The restaurant also sells some bulk items including tortillas, chile, carne adovada, posole, green chile stew, and sweet rolls.

References

External links

Restaurants established in 1971
Restaurants in Albuquerque, New Mexico
1971 establishments in New Mexico